The Vaughan House is a historic house at 2201 Broadway in central Little Rock, Arkansas.  It is a -story wood-frame structure, with a gabled roof, clapboard siding, and a high brick foundation.  A single-story porch extends across its front, supported by square posts set on stone piers.  Gabled dormers in the roof feature false half-timbering above the windows.  Most of the building's windows are diamond-paned casement windows in the Craftsman style.  The house was built about 1910 to a design by the noted Arkansas architect Charles L. Thompson.

The house was listed on the National Register of Historic Places in 1982.

See also
National Register of Historic Places listings in Little Rock, Arkansas

References

Houses on the National Register of Historic Places in Arkansas
Colonial Revival architecture in Arkansas
Houses completed in 1910
Houses in Little Rock, Arkansas
National Register of Historic Places in Little Rock, Arkansas
Historic district contributing properties in Arkansas